Redlands High School is a high school located in Redlands, California, alongside Redlands East Valley High School and Citrus Valley High School. It is the oldest Californian public high school still functioning on its original site.

History
The school was originally built in 1891 as a "unified high school" formed from three elementary school districts. Its auditorium was completed in 1928. The Girls' Gymnasium was completed as a New Deal Era project by the Public Works Administration in 1936.

Notable alumni
Dave Aranda, a college football head coach for the Baylor Bears
Robin Backhaus, a bronze medalist in the 1972 Olympics' 200M butterfly event
Joan Baez, a folksinger
Ed Vande Berg, a Major League Baseball pitcher
Brian Billick, a head coach of the Baltimore Ravens
Julio Cruz, the 2nd baseman for the Seattle Mariners from 1977 to 1982
Jack Dangermond, the co-founder and CEO of the software company ESRI
Skip Ewing, a country music singer
James Fallows, an author
Greg Horton, a professional football player with the Los Angeles Rams (from 1976 to 1980) and the Tampa Bay Buccaneers.
Patrick Johnson, a professional football player
John Jorgenson, a guitarist
Brad Little, an actor
Carl W. McIntosh, the president of Idaho State University (from 1946 to 1959), California State University, Long Beach (from 1959 to 1970), and Montana State University (from 1971 to 1977)
Frank Moore, a performance artist and 2008 presidential candidate
Michael A. Rogers, an author
George T. Sakato, a World War II Medal of Honor recipient
Jim Weatherwax, a professional football player for the Green Bay Packers.
Sera Gamble, Television writer and Producer, show runner for The Magicians (American TV series), and You (TV series)

References

External links
 

High schools in San Bernardino County, California
Redlands Unified School District
Public high schools in California
Buildings and structures in Redlands, California
1891 establishments in California